Flammula is a dark brown-spored genus of mushrooms that cause a decay of trees, on whose bases they often fruit, forming clusters of yellowish brown mushrooms.

Taxonomy

For nearly a century, Flammula was considered to be a synonym of Pholiota, a mushroom genus in the Strophariaceae. Molecular analysis placed it outside of the Strophariaceae and specifically in the Hymenogastraceae. As a distinct genus, the name Flammula is currently used.

References

Hymenogastraceae
Taxa named by Elias Magnus Fries